Geographically, the Mandallaz Mountain is a small pre-Alpine massif  long by 3–4 km (1.9–2.5 mi) wide, between  and  high (the top is called "The Head"), north-west of Annecy in the Haute-Savoie department in the Rhône-Alpes region in south-eastern France.  The Mandallaz has a mirror break, which provoked an earthquake in 1996.

Annecy
Mountains of Haute-Savoie